is a Japanese manga artist. Sakuraba's best-known work is Minami-ke, a slice-of-life comedy about three sisters, which has run in Young Magazine since 2004 and has been adapted into an anime that has run multiple seasons. Sakuraba's other works include Kyō no Go no Ni (Today in Class 5-2), which also had an anime run; and Sonna Mirai wa Uso de Aru (The Future Is a Lie).

Works
 Kyō no Go no Ni – serialized in Bessatsu Young Magazine, 2002–2003;  published by Kodansha for 1 volume.
 Minami-ke – serialized in Young Magazine, 2004–ongoing; published by Kodansha for 18 volumes. 
  – serialized in Bessatsu Shōnen Magazine, 2009–2016; published by Kodansha for 6 volumes.

References

External links

 Koharu Sakuraba works at Media Arts Database 

Living people
Manga artists
Year of birth missing (living people)